Streatham Street is a street in the London district of Bloomsbury, running between New Oxford Street and Great Russell Street.  In the 19th century, it was on the border of the disreputable rookery of St Giles, and so became the location for new accommodation which reformers planned would replace the slums.

Parnell House was built in the 1850s by Henry Roberts. Originally constructed for Improving the Condition of the Labouring Classes. The building was designed to make slum living a thing of the past. Whereas whole families had lived together in one room, now they could enjoy a more spacious living space. The Streatham Street apartments were the first multi level domestic building in the world.  Subsequent buildings were erected by George Peabody and Streatham Street was taken over by the Peabody Trust and modernised in later years.

References

Streets in the London Borough of Camden